Ramazan Dadaevich Emeev (born May 20, 1987 in Dagestan) is a Russian mixed martial artist. He is Combat Sambo World Champion who currently fights in the Welterweight division. He is a former M-1 Global middleweight champion and fought in the Ultimate Fighting Championship (UFC).

Background
Ramazan Emeev was born on May 20, 1987 in Dylym village, Kazbekovsky district, Dagestan, Soviet Union in a devout Sunni Muslim family of Avar origin. He started to train in freestyle wrestling at 6 years under Ali Iskhakov. In 2004 he studied in "Dagestan State University of National Economy". In 2005 he joined the MMA club Gorets under Musail Alaudinov and Shamil Alibatyrov. He won the Dagestan national pankration championship 2009 and the world combat sambo title.

Mixed martial arts career

M-1 Global
At M-1 Global Emeev has a record of 9–1 and was middleweight champion, he beat Bellator MMA veteran Vyacheslav Vasilevsky, Mario Miranda, Luigi Fioravanti, Maiquel Falcao and Anatoly Tokov.

Ultimate Fighting Championship
Emeev signed his UFC contract on 28 May 2017.

Emeev was expected to face Trevor Smith on October 21, 2017 at UFC Fight Night 118. However, Smith pulled out of the fight on 6 October was replaced by Sam Alvey. At the weigh ins, Alvey missed the middleweight limit of 185 pounds, coming in at 189 pounds. As a result, his bout with Alvey was changed to a catchweight and Alvey was fined 20% of his purse. Emeev won the fight via unanimous decision.

Emeev faced Alberto Mina at welterweight bout on 12 May 2018 at UFC 224. He won the fight via unanimous decision.

Emeev was expected to face Cláudio Silva on September 15, 2018 at UFC Fight Night 136. However, Silva pulled out of the fight in early-September citing a lower back injury. Emeev eventually faced promotional newcomer Stefan Sekulić. He won the fight by unanimous decision with the scoreboard of (30-25, 30-25, 30-25).

Emeev was scheduled to face Michel Prazeres at UFC on ESPN+ 3. However, on February 4, 2019 it was reported that Emeev pulled out of the fight, citing injury.

A bout with Cláudio Silva was rescheduled and was expected to take place on August 3, 2019 at UFC on ESPN 5. In turn, Emeev was removed from this event due to alleged visa issues, that restricted his travel to the United States. He was replaced by promotional newcomer Cole Williams.

Emeev faced Anthony Rocco Martin on November 9, 2019 at UFC on ESPN+ 21. He lost the fight via unanimous decision.

Emeev was scheduled to face Tim Means on February 15, 2020 at UFC Fight Night 167. However, Emeev was removed from the bout in late-January for undisclosed reasons and replaced by Daniel Rodriguez.

Emeev was scheduled to face Shavkat Rakhmonov on July 26, 2020 at UFC on ESPN 14. However, on July 3, 2020 it was reported that  Rakhmonov was forced to pull from the bout due to injury and he was replaced by Niklas Stolze. Emeev won the fight via unanimous decision.

Emeev faced David Zawada on January 16, 2021 at UFC on ABC 1. He won a close fight by split decision.

Emeev was scheduled to face Warlley Alves on June 26, 2021 at UFC Fight Night 190. However, Emeev pulled out in mid June due to undisclosed reasons, and he was replaced by promotional newcomer Jeremiah Wells.

Emeev faced Danny Roberts on October 16, 2021 at UFC Fight Night 195. He lost the bout via controversial split decision. 10 out of 12 media outlets scored the bout as a win for Emeev.

Emeev faced Jack Della Maddalena on June 11, 2022, at UFC 275. He lost the fight via TKO in round one.

On August 8, 2022, it was announced that Emeev was no longer on the UFC roster.

Championships and accomplishments

Mixed martial arts
M-1 Global
M-1 Challenge Middleweight Championship (twice)

Mixed martial arts record

|-
|Loss
|align=center|20–6
|Jack Della Maddalena
|TKO (punches)
|UFC 275
|
|align=center|1
|align=center|2:32
|Kallang, Singapore
|
|-
|Loss
|align=center|20–5
|Danny Roberts
| Decision (split)
|UFC Fight Night: Ladd vs. Dumont 
|
|align=center|3
|align=center|5:00
|Las Vegas, Nevada, United States
|
|-
|Win
|align=center|20–4
|David Zawada
| Decision (split)
| UFC on ABC: Holloway vs. Kattar 
| 
| align=center|3
| align=center|5:00
| Abu Dhabi, United Arab Emirates
| 
|-
|Win
|align=center|19–4
|Niklas Stolze
|Decision (unanimous)
|UFC on ESPN: Whittaker vs. Till 
|
|align=center|3
|align=center|5:00
|Abu Dhabi, United Arab Emirates
|
|-
|Loss
|align=center|18–4
|Anthony Rocco Martin
|Decision (unanimous)
|UFC Fight Night: Magomedsharipov vs. Kattar 
|
|align=center|3
|align=center|5:00
|Moscow, Russia
|
|-
|Win
|align=center|18–3
|Stefan Sekulić
|Decision (unanimous)
|UFC Fight Night: Hunt vs. Oleinik 
|
|align=center|3
|align=center|5:00
|Moscow, Russia
|
|-
|Win
|align=center|17–3
|Alberto Mina
|Decision (unanimous)
|UFC 224
|
|align=center|3
|align=center|5:00
|Rio de Janeiro, Brazil
|
|-
|Win
|align=center|16–3
|Sam Alvey
|Decision (unanimous)
|UFC Fight Night: Cowboy vs. Till
|
|align=center|3
|align=center|5:00
|Gdańsk, Poland
|
|-
|Win
|align=center|15–3
|Anatoly Tokov
|Decision (majority)
|M-1 Challenge 73: Battle of Narts
|
|align=center|3
|align=center|5:00
|Nazran, Russia
|
|-
|Win
|align=center|14–3
|Maiquel Falcão
|Submission (anaconda choke)
|M-1 Challenge 65: Emeev vs. Falcão
|
|align=center|1
|align=center|2:50
|Saint Petersburg, Russia
|
|-
|Win
|align=center|13–3
|Luigi Fioravanti
|TKO (corner stoppage)
|M-1 Challenge 63: Puetz vs. Nemkov 2
|
|align=center|4
|align=center|5:00
|Saint Petersburg, Russia
|
|-
|Win
|align=center|12–3
|Vyacheslav Vasilevsky
|Submission (rear-naked choke)
|M-1 Challenge 56
|
|align=center|1
|align=center|1:48
|Moscow, Russia
|
|-
|Loss
|align=center|11–3
|Vyacheslav Vasilevsky
|TKO (punches)
|M-1 Challenge 51: Fightspirit
|
|align=center|4
|align=center|4:34
|Saint Petersburg, Russia
|
|-
|Win
|align=center|11–2
|Mario Miranda
|KO (knee and punches)
|M-1 Challenge 38: Spring Battle
|
|align=center|3
|align=center|0:21
|Saint Petersburg, Russia
|
|-
|Win
|align=center|10–2
|Mario Miranda
|Decision (unanimous)
|M-1 Challenge 35: Emelianenko vs. Monson
|
|align=center|5
|align=center|5:00
|Saint Petersburg, Russia
|
|-
|Win
|align=center|9–2
|Albert Duraev
|KO (punches)
|M-1 Global: Fedor vs. Rizzo
|
|align=center|1
|align=center|1:36
|Saint Petersburg, Russia
|
|-
|Win
|align=center|8–2
|Ruslan Nadzhafaliev
|Submission (rear-naked choke)
|M-1 Challenge 29: Samoilov vs. Miranda
|
|align=center|2
|align=center|2:50
|Ufa, Russia
|
|-
|Win
|align=center|7–2
|Murad Magomedov
|Decision (unanimous)
| M-1 Challenge 25: Zavurov vs. Enomoto
|
|align=center|3
|align=center|5:00
|Saint Petersburg, Russia
|
|-
|Win
|align=center|6–2
| Andrei Ogorodniy
|Submission (armbar)
|ProFC: Union Nation Cup 13
|
|align=center|1
|align=center|1:36
|Kharkiv, Ukraine
|
|-
|Win
|align=center|5–2
|Artur Kadlubek
|Decision (unanimous)
|ProFC: Union Nation Cup 12
|
|align=center|2
|align=center|5:00
|Tbilisi, Georgia
|
|-
|Win
|align=center|4–2
|Denis Gunich
|Submission (rear-naked choke)
|ProFC: Union Nation Cup 11
|
|align=center|1
|align=center|2:30
|Nalchik, Russia
|
|-
|Loss
|align=center|3–2
|Mukhamed Aushev
|Decision (unanimous)
|ProFC: Union Nation Cup 9
|
|align=center|2
|align=center|5:00
|Geneva, Switzerland
|
|-
|Win
|align=center|3–1
|Artem Grishaev
|Submission (armbar)
|LM Tournament 3
|
|align=center|1
|align=center|0:23
|Lipetsk, Russia
|
|-
|Win
|align=center|2–1
|Alexei Nazarov
|Decision (unanimous)
|Warrior Glory
|
|align=center|3
|align=center|5:00
|Volgograd, Russia
|
|-
|Loss
|align=center|1–1
|Ali Bagov
|Submission (triangle choke)
|Global Battle
|
|align=center|1
|align=center|1:30
|Perm, Russia
|
|-
|Win
|align=center|1–0
|Maxim Lunegov
|Submission (rear-naked choke)
|Global Battle
|
|align=center|1
|align=center|1:47
|Perm, Russia
|
|-

References

External links
  
 

1987 births
Living people
Russian male mixed martial artists
People from Kazbekovsky District
Welterweight mixed martial artists
Mixed martial artists utilizing sambo
Mixed martial artists utilizing freestyle wrestling
Mixed martial artists utilizing pankration
Avar people
Ultimate Fighting Championship male fighters
Russian sambo practitioners
Sportspeople from Dagestan
21st-century Russian people
20th-century Russian people